Deepti Kiran Maheshwari or Deepti Maheshwari is an Indian politician who is an elected member of the Rajsamand constituency of the Rajasthan Legislative Assembly. She is the daughter of former Rajsamand assembly member Kiran Maheshwari and is a nominee from the Bharatiya Janata Party.

Political life
Her mother Kiran Maheshwari, who was a member of Rajsamand constituency until 2020. She died on 30 November 2020 as a result of COVID-19, leading to a by-election for the Rajsamand constituency in 2021 in Rajsamand, where Deepti was elected as the member.

References

1987 births
Bharatiya Janata Party politicians from Rajasthan
Women in Rajasthan politics
People from Udaipur
Living people
Rajasthan MLAs 2018–2023
21st-century Indian women politicians